Edwin Rolfe (September 7, 1909 – May 24, 1954) was an American poet and journalist. His first collected poetry appeared in an anthology of four poets called We Gather Strength (1933). Three more collections followed, none of which were conventionally published. To My Contemporaries (1936) was published by the small Dynamo Press and included works by Archibald MacLeish. First Love and Other Poems (1951) was sold to subscribers. Permit Me Refuge (1955) was posthumous and published by the California Quarterly, whose editor Philip Stevenson took up a collection from Rolfe's friends, such as Albert Maltz, to pay for it. Thomas McGrath wrote its foreword. Rolfe's poetry was inseparable from historical events: it responded to the Great Depression, the Spanish Civil War, and the era of McCarthyism. As a poet and journalist, he contributed extensively to The Daily Worker between 1927 and 1939.

Early life
He was born Solomon Fishman in Philadelphia in 1909, the first of three sons. His parents were immigrants from Russia, and had married the year before, having met through a marriage broker. Both of his parents were politically active, with his mother involved in the suffrage and birth control movements, and his father a labor organizer and union officer. In 1915 the family moved to New York. Rolfe attended New Utrecht High School and contributed to the school magazine, The Comet and eventually became its editor, following Leo Hurwitz, who was a close friend of Rolfe in his early years. During this period Rolfe (then Fishman) began to use pseudonyms, and eventually settled on "Edwin Rolfe".

Spanish Civil War
Rolfe married in 1936, and both he and his wife traveled to Spain in 1937.

He served in the Spanish Civil War with the Abraham Lincoln Brigade as a commissar, taking part in the Battle of the Ebro in 1938. He also worked on the International Brigades Volunteer for Liberty newspaper.

Rolfe met Ernest Hemingway when they were both in Spain, and, according to Jacket magazine their friendship and correspondence lasted the rest of his life.

World War II and after
He was conscripted into the US Army, in 1943.  After the war he returned to work as a writer, co-writing the mystery novel, The Glass Room.  He was commissioned to write a history of American volunteers during the Spanish Civil War.  He went to Hollywood to develop a script for The Glass Room.  Jacket magazine wrote that he was blacklisted following the House Un-American Activities Committee's investigation into Communists in Hollywood.

Legacy

According to a biography from the Poetry Foundation fellow poet Reginald Gibbons said his ”Civil War poems may be the best written by an American writer.”

When the University of Illinois Press brought out a collection of his best poems, they called him "the poet laureate of the Abraham Lincoln Battalion."

Bibliography
Poetry
 We Gather Strength. Poems by Herman Spector, Joseph Kalar, Edwin Rolfe, Sol Funaroff. Introduction by Mike Gold. New York: Liberal Press, 1933.
 To My Contemporaries: Poems By Edwin Rolfe. New York: Dynamo, 1936.
 First Love, and Other Poems. Los Angeles: Larry Edmunds Book Shop, 1951.
 Permit Me Refuge. Los Angeles: The California Quarterly, 1955.

Fiction
 The Glass Room. New York: Rinehart, 1946. Coauthored with Lester Fuller.

Non-fiction
 The Lincoln Battalion: The Story of the Americans Who Fought in Spain in the International Brigades. New York: Random House, 1939.

References

1909 births
1954 deaths
20th-century American poets
American communists
American male poets
Poets from New York (state)
Abraham Lincoln Brigade members
20th-century American male writers